The 2018 United States House of Representatives elections in Oklahoma were held on November 6, 2018, to elect the five U.S. representatives from the state of Oklahoma, one from each of the state's five congressional districts. The elections coincided with other elections to the House of Representatives, elections to the United States Senate and various state and local elections. Primary elections were held on June 26 and runoff elections were held two months later on August 28. The state congressional delegation changed from 5-0 majority for Republicans to a 4-1 Republican majority. This is the first time since the 2012 election that Democrats held a seat in the state, and as of 2022, the last election in which Democrats won any house race in Oklahoma.

Results summary

Statewide

District
Results of the 2018 United States House of Representatives elections in Oklahoma by district:

District 1

The 1st district is located in the Tulsa metropolitan area and includes Creek, Rogers, Tulsa, Wagoner and Washington counties. The incumbent was Republican Jim Bridenstine, who had represented the district since 2013. He was re-elected unopposed in the general election and with 81% of the vote in the Republican primary.

During his initial election in 2012, Bridenstine self-imposed a three term limit.  Bridenstine has confirmed he will honor his term-limit pledge.

Bridenstine has become Administrator of NASA in the Donald Trump administration.

Republican primary

Candidates

Declared
 Andy Coleman, veteran
 Nathan Dahm, State Senator
 Tim Harris, Tulsa district attorney
 Kevin Hern, businessman
 Danny Stockstill

Results

Runoff

Polling

Results

Democratic primary
Declared
 Amanda Douglas, business analyst, energy consultant and member of the Cherokee Nation
 Tim Gilpin, attorney, and former Oklahoma State Board of Education member

Results

Runoff results

General election

Predictions

Polling

Results

District 2

The 2nd district is located in the regions of Green Country and Kiamichi Country and includes the city of Muskogee and numerous sparsely populated counties. The incumbent is Republican Markwayne Mullin, who has represented the district since 2013. He was re-elected with 71% of the vote in 2016.

Mullin had pledged to serve only three terms when he was first elected in 2012.  During the 2016 campaign, Mullin stated he was reassessing his pledge, and refused to rule out running again in 2018.

Republican primary

Candidates

Declared
 Markwayne Mullin, incumbent
 Brian Jackson
 Jarrin Jackson, veteran, conservative activist, and candidate for the seat in 2016
 John McCarthy

Results

Endorsements

Democratic primary

Results

Runoff results

General election

Predictions

Polling

Results

District 3

The 3rd district is located in Western Oklahoma. The largest district in Oklahoma and one of the largest in the country, it includes the Oklahoma Panhandle, Ponca City and the city of Stillwater as well as the Osage Nation. The incumbent is Republican Frank Lucas, who has represented the district since 2003 and previously represented the 6th district from 1994 to 2003. He was re-elected with 78% of the vote in 2016.

Republican primary
 Frank Lucas, incumbent

Democratic primary

Results

General election

Predictions

Polling

Results

District 4

The 4th district is located in South Central Oklahoma and includes the suburbs of Oklahoma City, such as the counties of  Canadian, Comanche and Cleveland and numerous other sparsely populated counties. The incumbent is Republican Tom Cole, who has represented the district since 2003. He was re-elected with 70% of the vote in 2016.

Republican primary

Results

Democratic primary

Results

Runoff results

General election

Predictions

Polling

Results

District 5

The 5th district is located in Central Oklahoma and centered around the state capital, Oklahoma City, and the surrounding areas such as Edmond and Shawnee. The incumbent was Republican Steve Russell, who had represented the district since 2015. He was re-elected with 57% of the vote in 2016. He was defeated by Democratic challenger Kendra Horn in the 2018 election.

Republican primary

Results

Democratic primary

Results

Runoff results

General election

Predictions

Polling

Results

References

External links
Candidates at Vote Smart 
Candidates at Ballotpedia 
Campaign finance at FEC 
Campaign finance at OpenSecrets

Official campaign websites for first district candidates
Tim Gilpin (D) for Congress
Kevin Hern (R) for Congress

Official campaign websites for second district candidates
Markwayne Mullin (R) for Congress
Jason Nichols (D) for Congress

Official campaign websites for third district candidates
Frank Lucas (R) for Congress
Frankie Robbins (D) for Congress

Official campaign websites for fourth district candidates
Mary Brannon (D) for Congress
Tom Cole (R) for Congress

Official campaign websites for fifth district candidates
Steve Russell (R) for Congress
Kendra Horn (D) for Congress 

United States House of Representatives
Oklahoma
2018